We've Just Got Married (German: Wir haben eben geheiratet) is a 1949 Austrian comedy film directed by Hans Effenberger and starring Lotte Lang, Maria Eis and Hans Olden.

Cast
 Lotte Lang as Didi 
 Maria Eis as Frau Geduldig 
 Hans Olden as Max 
 Ida Russka as Mary de la Mamarides, ehemalig. Operettendiva 
 Heliane Bei as Daisy 
 Richard Lorenz as James & Jim 
 Fritz Neubard as Juan 
 Fred Raul as Uli 
 Mimi Shorp as Betty Black, Soubrette
 Ernst Neuhardt
 Louis Stroh
 Eva Symo
 Hermann Wallbrück

References

Bibliography 
 Fritsche, Maria. Homemade Men in Postwar Austrian Cinema: Nationhood, Genre and Masculinity. Berghahn Books, 2013.

External links 
 

1949 films
Austrian comedy films
1949 comedy films
1940s German-language films
Austrian black-and-white films